Gentlemen is the fourth studio album by American alternative rock band the Afghan Whigs. It was recorded primarily at Ardent Studios in Memphis, with the band's frontman Greg Dulli producing, and released on October 5, 1993, by Elektra Records.

Written by Dulli on tour for the band's 1992 album Congregation, Gentlemen is composed as a troubling song cycle that follows a toxic relationship as it ends. Noted for Dulli's grimly acerbic lyrics and influences from soul music, it is considered by critics to be the Afghan Whigs' greatest record, an essential release from the 1990s, and among the best-written breakup albums. The album was remastered in deluxe format for its 21st anniversary and covered extensively in a dedicated volume of the 33⅓ music book series.

Writing and recording

The Afghan Whigs frontman Greg Dulli, an amateur filmmaker during his teenage years, took direct inspiration for Gentlemens thematic concept from Francis Ford Coppola's 1982 romantic fantasy film One from the Heart, identifying especially with the lead character played by Frederic Forrest. "He was just a real kind of heel", Dulli explained. "But you could tell he didn't want to be one, that he wasn't really one." With this idea as an impetus, Dulli proceeded in his songwriting to see the extent to which he could explore "the dark psyche of the '90s male".

Having covered Motown songs on the band's final release for the Sub Pop label (1992's Uptown Avondale), Dulli wanted to experiment with more sympathetic sounds through the use of minor keys and slower tempos. Of the Motown influence, he cited the songs' upbeat musical moods and how they framed and contrasted sad lyrics. "And that's what I wanted to go into on Gentlemen", he explained. "How far can I go into it? How dark is dark?" Dulli also drew musical inspiration from Van Morrison's influential 1968 album Astral Weeks, particularly in its use of reoccurring melodic motifs and lyrical images throughout, albeit in different forms.

The Afghan Whigs recorded Gentlemen primarily at Ardent Studios in Memphis, with additional recording taking place at Cincinnati's Ultrasuede Studio. They took a "cinematic" approach to recording, with the album credits later describing the process as having been "shot on location" at Ardent. Along with original songs, the band recorded a cover of soul singer Tyrone Davis' 1970 song "I Keep Coming Back".

Artwork and title
The album cover was inspired by the 1983 photograph Nan and Brian in Bed, New York City by Nan Goldin. In his book about Gentlemen, Bob Gendron describes how Linda Ronstadt was allegedly furious over the album's cover. The album was titled Gentlemen ironically.

Reception and legacy

Gentlemen was hailed by Chicago Tribune critic Greg Kot as a "riveting song cycle of romantic burn-out" featuring a narrator of questionable decency. Kot applauded Dulli for capturing "the moment when infatuation loses its bloom and gives way to something a bit more realistic". Despite the band's roots in the Sub Pop label, the critic observed "a decidedly non-grungy brand of guitar rock, with slightly busy drumming and arrangements that mirror the turmoil in Greg Dulli's voice". In the Los Angeles Times, Richard Cromelin regarded the album as possibly "the most overlooked masterpiece" of 1993 and "a grueling immersion in the latest methods of warfare in the battle of the sexes—a dark, dramatic wallow in lust, shame, guilt, despair, deceit and obsession that's framed in dense, uplifting rock." Rolling Stone magazine's Matt Diehl noted "a clean, oddly detached hard-rock sound that shifts erratically between purgative and disarmingly pretty, adding tension to Dulli's caterwauling". Reviewing Gentlemen in March 1994 for The Village Voice, Robert Christgau applauded the raw recording quality and wrote in conclusion:

The album was included in the book 1001 Albums You Must Hear Before You Die. A 21st-anniversary deluxe reissue of the album, entitled Gentlemen at 21, was released on October 28, 2014. It received widespread critical acclaim, registering an aggregated score of 95 out of 100 at Metacritic. Commenting on its legacy at the time of the reissue, Orlando Weekly writer Ashley Belanger said, "It's heralded as one of the best break-up records ever written and considered an essential '90s release, due to the Whigs' creative fusion of R&B with that post-punk alternative rock sound signature to that era." Treble ranked Gentlemen at number 22 on its list of the 30 best grunge albums. Spin ranked the album at number 141 on their list of "The 300 Best Albums of the Past 30 Years (1985-2014)", stating that "musically, the Whigs perfected their unique alchemy of blackened soul and scabrous post-punk here, with frontman Greg Dulli’s sultry, sleazy, and sneering point of view leading the way into temptation."

In 2008, writer Bob Gendron published a critical and scholarly exploration of Gentlemen as part of the 33⅓ music book series exploring influential albums from pop history. Gendron's book included extensive interviews with band members and others within the Afghan Whigs' circle regarding the album's creation and impact.

Track listing
All tracks written by Greg Dulli, except where noted.

 "If I Were Going" – 3:05
 "Gentlemen" – 3:54
 "Be Sweet" (Dulli, Rick McCollum) – 3:37
 "Debonair" – 4:15
 "When We Two Parted" (Dulli, McCollum) – 5:47
 "Fountain and Fairfax" – 4:21
 "What Jail Is Like" – 3:30
 "My Curse" – 5:45
 "Now You Know" – 4:10
 "I Keep Coming Back" (Leo Austell, Leo Graham) – 4:52
 "Brother Woodrow/Closing Prayer" – 5:40

An LP version of the album also included a bonus 12" vinyl limited edition containing the following 4 tracks, originally recorded for a radio session (Goodier Session, BBC Radio 1):
 "Rot" (Marcy Mays, Sue Harshe, Carolyn O'Leary)
 "Fountain and Fairfax"
 "Keep Coming Back" (Austell, Graham)
 "Tonight"

Charts

Personnel
 Greg Dulli – vocals, rhythm guitar, producer
 Rick McCollum – lead guitar
 John Curley – bass, engineer
 Steve Earle – drums
 Harold Chichester – piano, mellotron
 Barb Hunter – cello
 Marcy Mays – vocals on "My Curse"
 Jody Stephens – back vocals on "Now You Know"
 Jeff Powell, John Hampton – engineer
 Jeffrey Reed – assistant engineer
 Billy Phelps – photography

References

External links
 

The Afghan Whigs albums
1993 albums
Albums produced by Greg Dulli
Elektra Records albums
Blast First albums